Polan Rural District is a rural district (dehestan) in Polan District, Chabahar County, Sistan and Baluchestan Province, Iran. At the 2006 census, its population was 28,799, in 5,352 families.  The rural district has 99 villages. At the 2016 census, its population had risen to 31,960.

References 

Chabahar County
Districts of Sistan and Baluchestan Province
Populated places in Chabahar County